KSPI-FM is a radio station airing a Hot AC format licensed to Stillwater, Oklahoma, broadcasting on 93.7 MHz FM. The station is owned by Stillwater Broadcasting, LLC.

References

External links
KSPI's official website

Hot adult contemporary radio stations in the United States
SPI